Ryan Bernard Harley (born 22 January 1985) is an English former professional footballer who is currently assistant manager at Notts County.

His previous clubs include Bristol City, Brighton & Hove Albion, Swansea City, Exeter City and Milton Keynes Dons.

Career

Bristol City 

Born in Bristol, Harley began his career with hometown club Bristol City. On 28 August 2004, Harley made his professional debut in a 3–0 loss against Port Vale at Vale Park in League One.

During the 2005–06 season, Harley was loaned to then Conference National side Forest Green Rovers. He made only 3 appearances for Rovers before returning to Bristol City.

Weston-super-Mare 

In October 2006, Harley signed for Conference South side Weston-super-Mare. Harley went on to score six times in 26 appearances for the club.

Exeter City 

In November 2007, Harley signed for Conference side Exeter City. He made his debut for the Grecians on 4 March 2008, coming on as a substitute for Andrew Taylor in a 2–2 draw against Crawley Town.

Harley's goal in the second leg of Exeter's play-off semi-final sparked a memorable comeback against rivals Torquay United. The victory took the Grecians to the play-off final at Wembley where they were promoted back to the Football League.

On 16 January 2010, Harley scored both goals against Leeds United in a 2–0 victory at St. James Park.

Harley scored the vital goal in the final game of the 2009–10 season against Huddersfield Town. The victory ensured Exeter's position in League One for the forthcoming season.

Swansea City 

On 21 January 2011, Harley signed for the then Championship side Swansea City on a free transfer. He was loaned back to Exeter for the remainder of the 2010–11 season. In spite of the move, Harley would not make an appearance for the Swans.

Swansea beat Reading in the Championship play-off final on 30 May 2011 to progress to the Premier League.

Brighton & Hove Albion 

On 22 August 2011, Harley joined Championship side Brighton & Hove Albion on a 3-year deal for an undisclosed fee.

Harley made his debut at home in a 1–0 victory against Sunderland in the League Cup. He made his league debut against Peterborough United, scoring the second goal in a 2–0 win with a spectacular 30-yard free-kick.

In December 2012, Harley joined League One side MK Dons on loan for the remainder of the 2012–13 season. He made 11 appearances and scored 1 goal for the Dons.

Swindon Town 

Harley completed a free transfer to League One side Swindon Town on 26 July 2013 after his contract at Brighton was terminated. He made 25 appearances and scored 4 goals during the 2013–14 season for the Robins.

Return to Exeter City 

On 20 November 2014 Harley was loaned to his former club Exeter City until January. He had previously trained with the club during the season. On 12 January 2015 Exeter signed Harley to an 18-month deal after his contract was cancelled by Swindon.

Milton Keynes Dons 
On 9 July 2018, Harley joined previous loan club and newly relegated League Two side Milton Keynes Dons, and scored on his league debut for the club on 4 August 2018 in a 1–2 away win over Oldham Athletic. He enjoyed promotion back to League One with the club at the conclusion of the 2018–19 season. Following the departure of manager Paul Tisdale early in the 2019–20, Harley took up more of a coaching role with the club and his appearances for the first team were limited. At the end of the season, Harley was one of nine players released.

Career statistics

Honours 
Exeter City
Conference Premier play-offs: 2008
Football League Two runner-up: 2008–09

Milton Keynes Dons
EFL League Two third-place promotion: 2018–19

References

External links 

Ryan Harley player profile at Exeter City

1985 births
Living people
English footballers
Association football midfielders
Bristol City F.C. players
Forest Green Rovers F.C. players
Weston-super-Mare A.F.C. players
Exeter City F.C. players
Swansea City A.F.C. players
Brighton & Hove Albion F.C. players
Milton Keynes Dons F.C. players
Bath City F.C. players
Swindon Town F.C. players
Frome Town F.C. players
English Football League players
National League (English football) players
Southern Football League players
Association football coaches
Notts County F.C. non-playing staff